A moonbase is an element in the hypothetical or fictional colonization of the Moon.

Moonbase or moon base, may also refer to:

Moon Base One, a 1960 novel by Hugh Walters
Moonbase (video game), a 1990 city-building video game
The Moonbase, a 1967 Doctor Who serial
Moonbase 3, a 1973 British science fiction television programme
Moonbase 8, a 2020 American comedy television series
MoonBase Commander, a 2002 strategy computer game
Project Moonbase, a 1953 science fiction film
Project Moonbase (podcast), a retrofuturistic music podcast

See also
 Moonbase Alpha (disambiguation)